Chistaya Dubrova is a rural locality (a selo) in Vesyegonsky District of Tver Oblast, Russia.

References

Rural localities in Vesyegonsky District
Vesyegonsky Uyezd